Marcel Fässler (born 27 May 1976) is a Swiss retired racing driver. From 2010 to 2016 he competed in the FIA World Endurance Championship as part of Audi Sport Team Joest with co-drivers André Lotterer and Benoît Tréluyer, winning the 24 Hours of Le Mans three times (2011, 2012, and 2014) and capturing the World Endurance Drivers' Championship in 2012.

Professional career

Touring car racing 
Born in Einsiedeln, Fässler began competing in the Deutsche Tourenwagen Masters for Mercedes-Benz when it resumed in 2000. He finished 4th with no wins in 2000, 4th with one win in 2001 and in 2002 and 3rd with one win in 2003, all four seasons with a Mercedes-Benz CLK. He moved to Opel and an Opel Vectra GTS V8 for 2004 and 2005, where he finished 9th and 12th with no wins after which the brand retired from the DTM.

Marcel also drove the Formula One Mercedes-Benz safety car for one event in Canada, while regular driver Bernd Mayländer was off due to an injury. He was on track for three laps after a crash involving Williams' Juan Pablo Montoya and Ferrari's Rubens Barrichello. He also worked as a successor in Monaco.

Sports car racing 
Fässler switched to sports cars in 2006, finishing second at the Spa 24 Hours in a Phoenix Aston Martin DBR9 and collecting two overall podiums at the Le Mans Series for Swiss Spirit. In 2007, he returned to open-wheel racing for A1 Team Switzerland in the 6th round of the A1 Grand Prix series held in Taupo, New Zealand, and in the 9th round at the Autódromo Hermanos Rodríguez, Mexico. He also won the Spa 24 Hours on a Chevrolet Corvette C6.R for Phoenix Carsport.

For 2008, Fässler joined the team for the full FIA GT Championship season. Sharing a GT1 class Corvette with Jean-Denis Delétraz, he won two races, finished 7th in the standings and helped the team finish 2nd at the teams championship. The same year he finished 2nd at the American Le Mans Series Road America race on a works Audi R10 TDI for Audi Sport North America. LMP1 team Sebah hired Fässler for the 2009 Le Mans Series season, having a 2nd-place finish as best result. In addition, he and Joël Camathias were crowned International GT Open overall and Super GT class champions in a Trottet-fielded Ferrari F430. He also retired at the 24 Hours of Le Mans driving a works GT1 class Corvette and finished 4th in the GT2 class of the petit Le Mans, also for Corvette Racing.

Audi works team Joest hired Fässler to drive the Audi R15 TDI plus at three 2010 races: Spa (12th), Le Mans (2nd) and Petit Le Mans (6th). He also retired at the 24 Hours of Spa running a Phoenix Audi R8 LMS. In 2016 Marcel re-joined Corvette Racing for the Rolex 24 Hours of Daytona and won the GTLM Class in the  No. 4 Chevrolet Corvette C7.R with regular season drivers Oliver Gavin and Tommy Milner by the smallest ever margin of victory 0.034 seconds.

Racing record

Complete Deutsche Tourenwagen Masters results
(key) (Races in bold indicate pole position) (Races in italics indicate fastest lap)

† — Retired, but was classified as he completed 90% of the winner's race distance.
1 - Shanghai was a non-championship round.

Complete 24 Hours of Le Mans results

Britcar 24 Hour results

Complete American Le Mans Series results

Complete FIA World Endurance Championship results

Complete WeatherTech SportsCar Championship results
(key) (Races in bold indicate pole position; races in italics indicate fastest lap)

Complete Blancpain GT Series Sprint Cup results

References

External links

 
 

1976 births
Living people
Swiss racing drivers
Formule Campus Renault Elf drivers
French Formula Renault 2.0 drivers
British Formula Three Championship drivers
French Formula Three Championship drivers
German Formula Three Championship drivers
A1 Team Switzerland drivers
Deutsche Tourenwagen Masters drivers
24 Hours of Le Mans drivers
24 Hours of Le Mans winning drivers
American Le Mans Series drivers
European Le Mans Series drivers
FIA World Endurance Championship drivers
FIA GT Championship drivers
Blancpain Endurance Series drivers
International GT Open drivers
ADAC GT Masters drivers
24 Hours of Spa drivers
WeatherTech SportsCar Championship drivers
24 Hours of Daytona drivers
People from Einsiedeln
24H Series drivers
Sportspeople from the canton of Schwyz
Audi Sport drivers
HWA Team drivers
Team Joest drivers
W Racing Team drivers
Oreca drivers
Phoenix Racing drivers
Corvette Racing drivers
Mercedes-AMG Motorsport drivers
Rebellion Racing drivers
La Filière drivers
Mücke Motorsport drivers
G-Drive Racing drivers
Nürburgring 24 Hours drivers
Porsche Carrera Cup Germany drivers